Bored & Hungry is a cryptocurrency-themed fast food restaurant in Long Beach, California. It is the first concept from Food Fighters Universe, the world's first NFT restaurant group owned by restaurateur Andy Nguyen. The restaurant is marketed around the Bored Ape Yacht Club, a series of non-fungible tokens, and payment is accepted in both United States dollars and cryptocurrency.

Store 
Bored & Hungry is located at 2405 E 7th St. in Long Beach, California. It occupies a  space that formerly belonged to a fried chicken restaurant and was almost replaced by a vegan burger location. It has a small menu consisting of smashburgers, veggie burgers, French fries, and soda. The signature menu item is the Trill Burger, a type of smashburger with multiple beef patties, caramelized onions, and a special sauce. Customers can purchase food through traditional currency or through two forms of cryptocurrency: ApeCoin and Ethereum.

History 
Bored & Hungry is owned by Andy Nguyen, the son of Vietnamese immigrants who came to the United States during the Vietnam War. Before Bored & Hungry, Nguyen created more than 10 restaurants, including the Afters Ice Cream chain, with 27 locations in California and Nevada. In March 2022, Nguyen purchased three non-fungible tokens (NFTs) from the Bored Ape Yacht Club: Bored Ape #6184 and two Mutant Apes. Doing so gave him the intellectual property ownership rights of the three NFTs, as well as access to an online community of other Bored Ape owners. Bored Ape #6184, which became the restaurant's logo, cost Nguyen $267,000, while the mutant apes cost an additional $65,000 to $75,000 each.

Bored & Hungry opened on April 9, 2022, attracting over 1,500 customers for its opening. Originally planned as a 90-day pop-up restaurant, the success that Bored & Hungry had upon opening led Nguyen to make the restaurant permanent.

Following the 2022 cryptocurrency crash, the Los Angeles Times reported on June 24 that Bored & Hungry was only accepting payment in United States dollars. Nguyen responded to the article on Twitter, calling the report "fake news" and stating that Bored & Hungry "still and will always accept ETH & ApeCoin at our store".

References 

2022 establishments in California
Fast-food hamburger restaurants
Restaurants in California
Cryptocurrency projects
Restaurants established in 2022